Jana Duļevska (born 12 June 1980 in Riga) is a Latvian actress and television presenter. She was the co-presenter of the Latvian version of the TV series Dancing with the Stars (Dejo ar zvaigzni! 3) in 2010.

References

Living people
1980 births
Actors from Riga
Latvian film actresses
Latvian television actresses
Latvian television personalities
Television people from Riga